Not Here to Please You is an EP by British band Hadouken! released in USB form and digital download only.

The band announced on 1 October 2007 that they would be doing something "slightly different" for their second mixtape. With the debut mixtape being released only on the Internet, it was announced that the second mixtape would be released in stores, as a 128MB USB memory stick.

The mixtape was set to feature 6 new Hadouken! songs, including the single "Leap of Faith" and a remix of a previous single, "Liquid Lives".

On 9 October 2007, the new track "Girls" was added to the band's website, as a flash banner, that when clicked played a low quality version of the new track. Upon the USB's release, some Mac users had problems with the product, however a fix was quickly posted on Hadouken!'s website.

On 18 November, "Leap of Faith" and "Love, Sweat and Beer" were released as online digital singles.

On 7 January 2008, tracks from the mixtape including "Leap of Faith" and "Girls" were released on iTunes and 7digital; the EP titled Love, Sweat and Beer EP contained four of the tracks from the mixtape.

Track listing

Tracks 4 and 12 were B-sides to "Liquid Lives"
Track 10 was a B-side to "That Boy That Girl"

Pure Grove version

 Free Hadouken! signed poster

References

Hadouken! albums
2007 EPs